John Woodcock may refer to:

Government
John Woodcock (magistrate) (born 1967), Italian prosecutor
John Woodcock (mayor) (d. 1409), mayor of London
John Woodcock (police officer) (1932–2012), British police officer
John A. Woodcock Jr. (born 1950), United States federal judge
John Woodcock, Baron Walney (born 1978), British politician

Others
John Woodcock (American football) (1954–1998), American football player
John Woodcock (cricket writer) (1926–2021), British cricket writer and journalist
John Woodcock (cyclist) (1903–1965), Irish cyclist
John Woodcock (martyr) (1603–1646), English Franciscan martyr